The Swan Creek AVA is an American Viticultural Area located in the northwestern portion of North Carolina, in the Piedmont region. The appellation is distinguished by its loamy soil with schist and mica. Established May 27, 2008, it is the second AVA to be established in North Carolina. It is a sub-appellation of the Yadkin Valley AVA.

Geography
The area is near the Brushy Mountains and includes parts of Wilkes, Yadkin, and Iredell counties.

The AVA shares its name with the unincorporated community of Swan Creek in Yadkin County.

Climate

Wineries
Windsor Run Cellars
Raffaldini Vineyards
Piccione Vineyards
Dobbins Creek Vineyards
Shadow Springs Vineyard
Laurel Gray Vineyards
Midnight Magdalena Vineyards

See also 
 Geography of North Carolina
 Laurel Gray Vineyards
 Midnight Magdalena Vineyards
 Raffaldini Vineyards
 Shadow Springs Vineyard
 Windsor Run Cellars
 Stardust Cellars

References

Geography of North Carolina
American Viticultural Areas
Geography of Iredell County, North Carolina
Geography of Wilkes County, North Carolina
Geography of Yadkin County, North Carolina
2008 establishments in North Carolina